VB Niederösterreich Sokol Post SV is an Austrian women's volleyball club based in Schwechat. It plays in the Austrian Volley League (AVL). The club is the most successful Austrian women's volleyball team in history, having won the national championship over 40 times.

The team constantly features in one of the European competitions, having played in all three CEV organized tournaments (CEV Champions League, CEV Cup and CEV Challenge Cup).

History
Background
The origins of the club can be traced back to the 1860s, when the Sokol movement started to spread across the Austrian Empire. In 1867, when Austria-Hungary was formed, the  society was founded.

Volleyball
Volleyball was introduced in Austria in 1925, initially being played and taught at the Komensky Real Gymnasium in Vienna X. During that time Sokol Vienna organized teams and tournaments, playing an important role to popularize the sport, and soon the club had volleyball sections in many different districts of Vienna. In 1953, Sokol was one of the founding members of the Austrian Volleyball Federation. Today's women's volleyball team is a combination of the original Sokol V (later renamed Post SV) with SV Schwechat.

Previous names
Due to sponsorship, the club have competed under the following names:
 Sokol Wien (1867–1925)
 Sokol V Wien (1925–)
 TJ Sokol V Wien (1940s–)
 Post SV Wien (–1988)
 Post SV Wien-PSK (1988–1990)
 Post SV Wien-Teleges (1990–1994)
 Post SV Wien-Gulet (1994–1997)
 Fujitsu-Post SV Wien (1997–1999)
 Post SV Wien-Telekom Austria (1999–2000)
 Post SV Wien (2000–2001)
 SG SV Schwechat/PSV Telekom (2001–2002)
 SG SV Schwechat/PSV Kuoni (2002–2005)
 SG SV Schwechat/Post SV (2005–2009)
 SG SVS Post (2009–2016)
 VB Niederösterreich Post SV (2016–2017)
 VB NÖ Sokol Post (2017–present)

Honours
Including Sokol Wien and Post Wien.

National competitions
 Austrian Championship: 46
1953, 1954, 1955, 1956, 1957, 1958, 1959, 1973, 1974, 1975, 1976, 1977, 1978, 1983, 1984, 1985, 1987, 1988, 1989, 1990, 1991, 1992, 1994, 1995, 1996, 1997, 1998, 1999, 2000, 2001, 2002, 2003, 2004, 2005, 2006, 2007, 2008, 2009, 2010, 2011, 2012, 2013, 2014, 2015, 2016, 2017 

 Austrian Cup: 25
1981, 1982, 1985, 1986, 1987, 1989, 1990, 1994, 1995, 1996, 1997, 1998, 1999, 2000, 2001, 2002, 2003, 2005, 2006, 2010, 2012, 2013, 2014, 2015, 2016

Regional competitions
 Interleague: 5
 1993, 1998, 1999, 2001, 2002

References

External links
 Official website 
 Official website 

Austrian volleyball clubs
Schwechat